David B. Walton (born October 27, 1978) is an American actor. He is known for his role in the television sitcom Cracking Up (2004), as Liam Connor. He has starred in several television programs, including the drama series Heist (2006), comedy series New Girl (2012–2018), and on the NBC comedies Perfect Couples (2010–2011), Bent (2012), and About a Boy (2014–2015). He played Dr. Rick in the comedy film Fired Up! (2009).

Early life and education
Born in Boston, Massachusetts, to John Hunter Walton Jr. and his wife, Carolyn K. Walton, he is one of seven siblings.

Walton graduated from St. Paul's School in Concord, New Hampshire in 1997. He is a 2001 graduate of Brown University in Providence, Rhode Island.

Personal life
On March 18, 2011, Walton married actress Majandra Delfino in Miami, Florida. They have two children, daughter Cecilia Delphine Walton (born June 14, 2012) and son Louis Augustus Walton (born November 10, 2013).

Filmography

See also

 List of Brown University people
 List of people from Boston

References

External links
 

1978 births
21st-century American male actors
American male film actors
American male television actors
Brown University alumni
Living people
Male actors from Boston
St. Paul's School (New Hampshire) alumni